Linjiangmen  is a station on Line 2 of Chongqing Rail Transit in Chongqing Municipality, China. It is located in Yuzhong District. It opened in 2004.

Station structure

References

Yuzhong District
Railway stations in Chongqing
Railway stations in China opened in 2004
Chongqing Rail Transit stations